The New Synagogue of Mainz is in use since 2010 as a community center at the location of the former main synagogue on the Hindenburgstraße of Mainz . Due to controversial discussions regarding the street name, the location in the Hindenburgstraße was renamed as Synagogenplatz (Synagogue square).

Initial position and planning
The Kristallnacht of 1938 ended this tradition. After the Second World War, the remains and premises of Mainz synagogues accommodated only a small group of returned community members. Before the fall of the Berlin wall the community had a mere 140 citizens in total. In the 1990s, a large number of immigrants from Eastern Europe grew the community and new space was required. By December 2006, the community had grown to number 1,050 members.

In 1999, there was a competition to design a new synagogue building and a Jewish community centre. The winner was architect Manuel Herz. The estimated cost was approximately €11 million (euro) and the city of Mainz gave assurances it would contribute €3.5 million. The financing model outlined that the city, Rhineland-Palatinate, and the Federal Republic of Germany each contribute one-third of the construction costs. A building permit was issued in 2000. The demolition of the general customs office building (erected in 1955) at the site was not started until October 2008.

The prayer sanctuary of the New Synagogue offers approximately 450 places which corresponds to five times the previous prayer capacity. The draft reminded the deconstructivist architecture and symbolic organisation of the Jewish Museum, Berlin.

A Magenza foundation under the patronage of Prime Minister Kurt Beck and Lord Mayor Jens Beutel was committed to the building and sustaining this new synagogue, and a further 29 citizens and notables from Mainz and the region belong to the establishment founders.

Architecture
The building reflects the Jewish-liturgical term Kedushah (קדושה) (Benediction saying for "sanctification and exaltation".) The Cologne architect, Manuel Herz, intended to symbolize this with the five Hebrew letters the five ranges of the Jewish center for community events, adult education and as Hebrew school for school children. The letterforms were originally developed from picture symbols, from which the initial at the beginning of the respective symbol was associated later. Hebrew letters attain an object character, a quality of the representational one. The eastward-directed, (towards Jerusalem), horn-shaped roof of the assembly place represents a shofar. Mythologically the shofar stands for communication with God. This form is used to express the call of the community after YHWH, for listening to and receiving of  eternal divine light and its wisdom. Traditionally the community was summoned together by blowing the shofar.

The synagogue contains a festival room, Mikveh, kosher kitchen, club room, kindergarten, classroom, social service, community office, library, meeting room and apartments. The Jewish community in Mainz offers an active cultural program, which is also open to non-Jewish visitors. The architect Manuel Herz received the German front prize for rainscreen fronts (VHF) in 2011. The building received the nomination for the Mies van der Rohe Prize for European Architecture, German Facade Prize 2011.

Progress
The foundation-stone for the New Synagogue in Mainz was laid on November 23, 2008, in a solemn ceremony in the presence of many invited guests. Andreas Berg and Dr. Peter Waldmann wrote the text of the foundation-stone role. The topping out ceremony was committed on October 16, 2009. The date for the inauguration was determined originally for June 17, 2010, but due to weather-related building delays in the winter 2009/2010 this date was shifted to September 3, 2010. This was the anniversary of the inauguration of the old main synagogue of 1912 as well. The chairman of the Jewish community, Stella Schindler-Siegreich, Prime Minister Kurt Beck and Mainz Mayor Jens Beutel were invited to the inauguration celebration. Among the numerous invited guests, from abroad and locally, were: former Jewish residents of Mainz, contemporary witnesses, community members, Federal President Christian Wulff and the Ambassador of the State of Israel to Germany Yoram Ben-Zeev.

References

External links

 manuelherz.com
 Flyer Magenza
 

Ashkenazi synagogues
Buildings and structures in Mainz
Synagogues completed in 2010
Synagogues in Germany